The 1974 Cincinnati Bearcats football team represented University of Cincinnati during 1974 NCAA Division I football season.

Schedule

Roster

References

Cincinnati
Cincinnati Bearcats football seasons
Cincinnati Bearcats football